Loretta A. Barcenas (born 19 December 1942) is a Filipino sprinter. She competed in the women's 4 × 100 metres relay at the 1964 Summer Olympics.

References

1942 births
Living people
Athletes (track and field) at the 1964 Summer Olympics
Filipino female sprinters
Olympic track and field athletes of the Philippines
Place of birth missing (living people)
Olympic female sprinters